Abhijeet is a masculine name common in the Indian subcontinent. The meaning of Abhijeet is "victorious" or "conqueror" or "who wins" in the Sanskrit language. Abhijit is the Sanskrit name for Vega, the brightest star in the northern constellation of Lyra. It also refers to a period of 48 minutes centered on solar noon which is considered a good time (Muhurat) to start any task.

Notable people with the name include:
 
 Abhijit Banerjee, Indian-American economist, Nobel Laureate in Economics 2019
 Abhijit Bhaduri, Indian author, columnist and management consultant
 Abhijit Chowdhury, India-based independent filmmaker
 Abhijit Chakraborty, Indian cricketer
 Abhijit Das (born 1969), Indian political leader & social activist
 Abhijit Deshmukh (engineer), Indian American engineer
 Abhijit Deshmukh (umpire), cricketer umpire
 Abhijit Deshpande, Indian cricketer
 Abhijit Dey,  Indian first-class cricketer who plays for Tripura
 Abhijit Guha (Indian Army officer), Indian Army officer
 Abhijit Guha (director), Indian film director, actor and writer
 Abhijit Kale, former Indian cricketer
 Abhijit Kunte, Indian chess player
 Abhijit Karambelkar, Indian cricketer
 Abhijit Kokate, Indian film editor
 Abhijit Pohankar, Indian classical keyboardist and fusion music producer
 Abhijit Mukherjee, Indian politician
 Abhijit Mondal, Indian footballer
 Abhijit Mahalanobis, Indian-American engineer
 Abhijit Sarkar (cricketer), Indian cricketer
 Abhijit Sarkar (footballer), Indian footballer
 Abhijit Salvi, Indian cricketer
 Abhijit Sen, former member of the Planning Commission of India
 Abhijit Vaghani, Indian music composer and producer
 Abhijith (actor), Indian Kannada-language actor
 Abhijith Kollam, Indian playback singer, popular in Malayalam
 Abhijith P. S. Nair, India violinist
 Abhijeet Chavan, Indian actor who works in Marathi and Hindi films
 Abhijeet Gupta, Indian chess player
 Abhijeet Singh Sanga, Indian politician
 Abhijeet Bhattacharya, Indian playback singer best known by his first name
 Abhijeet Gupta (born 1989), chess grandmaster
Abhijeet Kosambi (born 1982), classical singer and winner of Sa Re Ga Ma Pa -Maharashtra cha Maha Gayak
Abhijeet Sawant (born 1981), singer and winner of Indian Idol
 Abhijeeth Poondla, Indian actor who works in Telugu films
 Abhizeet Asom, Indian politician, chairperson of the United Liberation Front of Assam (Independent)
 Abijeet (actor), Indian actor, who works in Telugu films

References

 Indian masculine given names